Khopyorskyv is a rural locality (a settlement) and the administrative center of Khopyorskoye Rural Settlement, Novonikolayevsky District, Volgograd Oblast, Russia. The population was 394 as of 2010. There are 17 streets.

Geography 
Khopyorsky is located in steppe, on the Khopyorsko-Buzulukskaya Plain, 39 km east of Novonikolayevsky (the district's administrative centre) by road. Priovrazhny is the nearest rural locality.

References 

Rural localities in Novonikolayevsky District